The Imaginarium, also known as Imaginarium Productions, is a production company linked to a digital performance-capture studio based in London, founded by actor-director Andy Serkis and film producer Jonathan Cavendish in 2011. The studio is dedicated to the invention of believable, emotionally engaging digital characters using performance capture technology. It specialises in applying motion capture technology in film, television and video games. Since 2011, it has provided performance capture for international films including Rise of the Planet of the Apes (2011), Avengers: Age of Ultron (2015), and Star Wars: Episode VII – The Force Awakens (2015).

History

Andy Serkis first became interested in "cyber-thespianism" when he worked with Peter Jackson at his Weta Workshop in New Zealand for The Lord of the Rings trilogy and King Kong (2005). Serkis stated, "People come out of film schools not equipped with the skills for doing anything other than shooting kitchen sink drama. We need to change our mindset, cross-fertilise our talent and encourage writers, directors and producers to think on a much larger scale."

Serkis partnered with Jonathan Cavendish in 2009, opening The Imaginarium officially in 2011 after securing a permanent place at Ealing Studios in London. In January 2012 the studio signed an agreement with Vicon, the world's largest supplier of precision motion tracking systems.

In May 2017, The Imaginarium Studios was subject to a management buyout having lost £4.2 million over the preceding two years. The company went into administration on 15 May 2017 facing insolvency due to project delays.

The first feature film produced by The Imaginarium, Breathe, directed by Serkis (also the story of Robin Cavendish, the father of Serkis' business partner, Jonathan) and starring Andrew Garfield, Claire Foy, Tom Hollander, and Hugh Bonneville, was the opening night gala presentation of the 2017 BFI London Film Festival.

Filmography
Rise of the Planet of the Apes (2011)
Dawn of the Planet of the Apes (2014)
Avengers: Age of Ultron (2015)
Star Wars: Episode VII – The Force Awakens (2015)
War for the Planet of the Apes (2017)
 Breathe (2017; production studio) 
 The Ritual (2017; production studio)
Star Wars: Episode VIII - The Last Jedi (2017)
Mowgli: Legend of the Jungle (2018; production studio)
No One Gets Out Alive (2021)
Venom: Let There Be Carnage (2021)

Upcoming
 Next Goal Wins (2023; production studio)
 Animal Farm (TBA)
 The Last House on Needless Street (TBA)

TV shows
 Fungus The Bogeyman (2015)
 Death and Nightingales (2018)
 The Bastard Son & The Devil Himself (2022)

Music videos
"Adventure of a Lifetime" by Coldplay (2015)

Theatre
The Tempest, part of the Royal Shakespeare Company's 2016-17 season.

Video games
Battlefield 1 (2016)
Hellblade: Senua's Sacrifice (2017)
Planet of the Apes: Last Frontier (2017)
Star Citizen (TBA)

References

External links

Film production companies of the United Kingdom